Young V&A, formerly the V&A Museum of Childhood, is a branch of the Victoria and Albert Museum (the "V&A"), which is the United Kingdom's national museum of applied arts. It is in Bethnal Green and is located on the Green itself in the East End of London and specialises in objects by and for children.

History

The museum was founded in 1872 as the Bethnal Green Museum.   The iron structure reused a prefabricated building from Albertopolis which was replaced with some early sections of the modern V&A complex. The exterior of the building was designed by James William Wild in red brick in a Rundbogenstil (round-arched) style very similar to that in contemporary Germany.

The building was used to display a variety of collections at different times. In the 19th century, it contained food and animal products, and various pieces of art including the works which can now be seen at the Wallace Collection. It was remodelled as an art museum following World War I, with a children's section which subsequently grew in size. In 1974 the director of the V&A, Sir Roy Strong, defined it as a specialist museum of childhood.

Of all the branches, the Bethnal Green Museum has the largest collection of childhood objects in the United Kingdom.

The mission of the museum is "To enable everyone, especially the young, to explore and enjoy the designed world, in particular objects made for and made by children." It has extensive collections of toys, childhood equipment and costumes, and stages a programme of temporary exhibitions.

The museum closed in October 2005 for the second phase of extensive renovations, costing £4.7 million. It reopened in December 2006.

In 2019 a major transformation of the museum began. "Over 30,000 objects which had been on display or in storage at the museum" were audited and packed. After temporary storage at South Kensington, they will join the rest of the V&A East Museum at Stratford Waterfront "in a few years time".  

Inside the museum was a cast iron statue by John Bell, which has been based there since 1927. It came originally from  the Great Exhibition of 1851.  "The Eagle slayer" shows a marksman shooting at an eagle which has slain the lamb that lies at his feet. This has now been moved to the entrance of the Coalbrookdale Museum as it was cast in the Coalbrookdale Foundry.

The museum is a Grade II* listed building.

Transport connections

See also
Anthony Burton (former director)

References
Citations

Sources

External links

Interactive 360° virtual tour

Victoria and Albert Museum
Museums established in 1872
Children's museums in the United Kingdom
History of the London Borough of Tower Hamlets
Toy museums in England
Grade II* listed buildings in the London Borough of Tower Hamlets
Grade II* listed museum buildings
Museums in the London Borough of Tower Hamlets
Doll museums
History of childhood
Bethnal Green
Childhood in England